Hal Joseph Dues (September 22, 1954 - October 20, 2020) was an American professional baseball player and former Major League pitcher.

Career
Signed as an undrafted free agent by Montreal on May 20, 1974, after attending the University of Mary Hardin-Baylor, Belton, Texas, Dues appeared in 37 games in the Majors, 17 as a starting pitcher. He spent the entire  campaign with the Expos, working in 25 games (including 12 starts) and 99 innings pitched, and compiling a low 2.36 earned run average. He threw his only MLB complete game on July 8 against the Philadelphia Phillies, a six-hit, 8–1 victory at Veterans Stadium; Dues helped himself as a batsman that day, with two hits in four at bats with a run batted in and a run scored.

All told as a Major Leaguer, he allowed 128 hits and 55 bases on balls in 134 innings pitched, with 47 career strikeouts.  On June 17, 1978, in Dodgers Stadium, Dues pitched the final 4 innings of a 6-3 Expos victory, registering his only career major league save.  

Dues died October 20, 2020.

References

External links

1954 births
2020 deaths
American expatriate baseball players in Canada
Baseball players from Texas
Denver Bears players
Kinston Expos players
Major League Baseball pitchers
Mary Hardin–Baylor Crusaders baseball players
Memphis Chicks players
Montreal Expos players
People from La Marque, Texas
Québec Carnavals players
Quebec Metros players
West Palm Beach Expos players
Wichita Aeros players